William David Beauclerk Phillips (born 12 April 1993) is a New Zealand-born English former first-class cricketer.

Phillips was born at Auckland in April 1993. Moving to England, he later studied at Grey College, Durham. While studying at Durham, he made three appearances in first-class cricket for Durham MCCU, playing against Durham in 2015 and Gloucestershire and Durham in 2016. He scored 33 runs in his three matches, with a high score of 14. With his right-arm fast pace bowler, he took 7 wickets at an average of 38.85, with best figures of 3 for 45.

References

External links

1993 births
Living people
People from Auckland
New Zealand emigrants to England
Alumni of Grey College, Durham
English cricketers
Durham MCCU cricketers